Renzo Bonivento (15 August 1902 – 24 May 1963) was an Italian equestrian. He competed in two events at the 1936 Summer Olympics.

References

External links
 

1902 births
1963 deaths
Italian male equestrians
Olympic equestrians of Italy
Equestrians at the 1936 Summer Olympics
People from Sassari
Sportspeople from Sardinia